The 2012 FEI World Cup Finals in 's-Hertogenbosch was held from April 19 to April 22, 2012. It was the final of the Show jumping and Dressage World Cup series. This finals was held in the Brabanthallen.

Horse sport in 's-Hertogenbosch 
Each year the horse show Indoor Brabant is held in the Brabanthallen in 's-Hertogenbosch. A World cup competition in dressage and also one in show jumping are held here. Several times World Cup Finals are held as part of Indoor Brabant: 1994 in show jumping; 1986, 1988, 1990, 1993, 1997, 2000, 2002, 2008 and 2010 in dressage.

The horse show are held regularly end of March. In 2012 the event is postponed to April because of the World Cup Finals.

Dressage

Qualified riders 

Because of the early dated 2012 Summer Olympics Jeroen Devroe from Belgium did not start. So Jenny Schreven is moved up to the final, her horse Krawall is with an age of 20 years the oldest horse of the participating horses.

Agenda and results

Grand Prix 
At April 20, 2012 (12:00 noon) the Grand Prix de Dressage was held. It was the first competition of the Dressage World Cup final, but is did not count for the final ranking.

Result:

(Top 5 of 18 Competitors)

Grand Prix Freestyle (Final) 
The second competition of the Dressage World Cup final was the Grand Prix Freestyle, held at the afternoon of Saturday, April 21. Started as favourite, Adelinde Cornelissen won with her gelding Parzival this competition with 86.250% She defended her title, so she is again the World Cup Champion.

Result:

Show jumping

Qualified riders (World Cup Final) 
As in dressage, also in show jumping riders rid not start at the World Cup Final because of the date of the Summer Olympics. From the United Kingdom no one of the qualified riders start at the final.

° extra competitor (Extra competitors are riders, who live in a country, which is not part of the World Cup League of the country of this riders nationality. These riders are at first part of the World Cup League of the country in which they live. At the end of the season this riders deducted from the final score of this league. If they have just as many or more points as the last qualified rider, they have the chance to start at the World Cup Final.)

Agenda and results

World Cup

Final I 
The first competition of the Show Jumping World Cup Final, a speed and handiness competition, was held at Thursday afternoon (April 19, 2012). The result of this competition was converted into faults for the World Cup Final standings.

Result:

(Top Ten of 37 competitors)

Last year final winner Christian Ahlmann had three obstacle faults in the speed and handiness competition, so he had result of 76.09 seconds. Because of this result he had no chance to defend his title, so he did not start in the further final competitions.

Final II 
At April 20 afternoon the second competition of the Show Jumping World Cup Final, a show jumping competition with one jump-off, was held. After the second round, the World Cup Points were converted in Penalties for the Final III.

Result:

(Top Ten of 33 competitors)

Final III 
The third competition of this final will be held at April 22, 2012 at 2:00 pm. It will be a competition over two different rounds, both not against the clock. Here only the 25 best placed riders have the chance to start in this competition, in the second round of the Final III only 19 riders start with their horses.

Result:

(Top 8 of 24 competitors)

Final standings 
The decision about the title "World Cup Champion 2011-2012" took place in a jump-off. Two riders, Steve Guerdat from Switzerland and Rich Fellers from the US had only one point after four rounds in three competitions in this World Cup Final. First rider in the jump-off was Guerdat with his gelding Nino des Buissonnets. He ride very fast and had a time of 26.61 seconds. After him Fellers start with his Flexible: His time was nearly equal to Guerdats time most time of the jump-off. But one turn Rich Fellers ride much faster than Guerdat, so he was 64 hundredths of a second faster than the time of Steve Guerdat.

With this victory Rich Fellers is the first rider from the United States, who win the Show jumping World Cup since 25 years (in 1987 won Katharine Burdsall from the US).

Crucial jump-off:

Total result before the crucial jump-off:

ELI = eliminatedDNS = did not startRET = retired

Further competitions

Grand Prix (CSI 3*) 
Also a CSI 3* is held at the “Indoor Brabant“ 2012. The Grand Prix of this show jumping horse show was held at Saturday, April 21, 2012 (9:30 pm). It was a show jumping competition with one jump-off, the fences will be up to 1.55 meters. The competition was endowed with € 100.000, the sponsor was the Rabobank.

Result:

(Top 5 of 29 Competitors)

Besides the sport 
Unexpected of everyone the German dressage team coach Holger Schmezer died at April 19 afternoon in his hotel room. The German dressage riders wore a black armband on their tailcoat as a sign of mourning in the Grand Prix de Dressage. After the Grand Prix de Dressage a minute's silence in memory of Holger Schmezer was held.

References

External links 
 Website of Indoor Brabant (Dutch / English)
 Results

Dressage World Cup
Show Jumping World Cup
2012 in equestrian
2012 in Dutch sport
Equestrian sports competitions in the Netherlands
International sports competitions hosted by the Netherlands
Sports competitions in 's-Hertogenbosch